The Battle of Mount Street Bridge was fought on 26 April 1916 between the British Army and Irish rebels during the Easter Rising. It took place in Dublin at the southern end of Mount Street Lower where it meets the Grand Canal.

Background 
On 24 April 1916, Easter Monday, after Éamon de Valera headed his Volunteers' contingent into Boland's Bakery, another group of 17 Volunteers was sent to secure the Dún Laoghaire road to stall anticipated British reinforcements. The 17 volunteers were distributed around Mount Street Bridge: 25 Northumberland Road was initially occupied by four Volunteers, although two were dismissed home for being too young; four Volunteers occupied the Parochial Hall, seven Volunteers held Clanwilliam House, and two were stationed in the Schoolhouse. On 26 April, a female dispatcher informed that nearly 2,000 British soldiers had landed at Dún Laoghaire and that the Robin Hood Battalion, the 7th Battalion Sherwood Foresters, was heading towards them.

Battle 
The advancing British stopped at Carisbrook House and learned about the Volunteers' presence in the area, responding to sniper fire. The column came under fire from the two men in 25 Northumberland Road, and it took the British five hours of continued firing to dislodge them from the building. Volunteers in the other buildings nearby also shot at exposed British forces. The Volunteers held the bridge against British forces for nine hours. The battle resulted in the biggest losses to both the British Army and the rebels during the uprising, when at least 26-30 British soldiers fell and some 134 were wounded, while four Volunteers were killed in the action - Dick Murphy, George Reynolds, Michael Malone and Patrick Doyle.

In popular culture 
The battle is depicted in the docudrama television series Insurrection.

See also 

 Patrick Whelan
 Theobald Wolfe Tone FitzGerald
 Joe Clarke
 Louisa Nolan

References 

Easter Rising
Conflicts in 1916
Battles involving the United Kingdom
1916 in Ireland
April 1916 events